Holyhead Mountain (Welsh Mynydd Twr, from mynydd 'mountain, unenclosed land' and twr 'a heap, pile') is the highest mountain on Holy Island, Anglesey, and the highest in the county of Anglesey, north Wales. It lies about two miles west of the town of Holyhead, and slopes steeply down to the Irish Sea on two sides. Ireland can be seen from here on a clear day and the mountain is an important site for seabirds.

The mountain
Holyhead Mountain is located on Holy Island, Anglesey, jutting out into the Irish Sea. At , it is the highest mountain in the county of Anglesey, being higher than Bodafon Mountain on the main island. On the east side of the mountain is the site of a late Roman watchtower called Caer y Twr ('the fort of the pile/heap'). Holyhead Mountain also has the remains of a group of Iron Age huts near its foot. This shows evidence of being occupied in the middle part of the Stone Age, the Neolithic Age, the Bronze Age and the Iron Age. There are traces of field systems and the bases of dry-stone walls of twenty huts, and there are a number of standing stones in the vicinity.

The summit of the mountain is rocky, quartzite, and the slopes clad in heather. There is an Iron Age hillfort called Caer y Twr. On the mountain are also the remains of a brickworks, which closed in 1973. Specialist bricks produced here were also used in construction of the breakwater.

Holyhead Mountain attracts many visitors, and it is also located close to South Stack lighthouse; many people come to see the variety of birds that nest along the cliff faces near South Stack. Views from the summit are extensive, especially to the west, where the Wicklow Mountains in Ireland can often be seen across the Irish Sea on clear days. Birds that nest here include Atlantic puffins, stonechats and Eurasian oystercatchers, and grey seals can be seen offshore during the summer.

Gallery

References

External links 
 Ancient Britain - Holyhead Mountain Hut Group
 Ancient Britain - Caer Y Tŵr
 www.geograph.co.uk : photos of Holyhead Mountain and surrounding area

Marilyns of Wales
Mountains and hills of Anglesey
Highest points of Welsh counties
Trearddur